Hellen Lukoma is a Ugandan, actress, model, fashion designer and singer. She is well known for her roles as Patra on The Hostel, Hellen Mutungi on Beneath The Lies,  kyaddala. She rose to fame as a member of the all girl music group The Obsessions before venturing into modelling, fashion design and acting.

Background 
Hellen was born and raised in Kampala. She grew up in a family of six siblings and she was the last born.

Education 
Hellen attended Shimon Primary School and Lubiri Senior Secondary School. She then joined Makerere University Business School and attained a Bachelor's degree in Internal business.

Filmography

Film

Television

Personal life 
She is married to Anwar Kaka with two children.

References

External links
 

Living people
Ugandan film actresses
Ugandan television actresses
People from Kampala
Ugandan television presenters
Ugandan television personalities
21st-century Ugandan actresses
Ugandan women television presenters
1989 births